János Fórizs (born 17 March 1969) is a Hungarian wrestler. He competed in the men's freestyle 68 kg at the 1996 Summer Olympics.

References

External links
 

1969 births
Living people
Hungarian male sport wrestlers
Olympic wrestlers of Hungary
Wrestlers at the 1996 Summer Olympics
People from Mezőtúr
Sportspeople from Jász-Nagykun-Szolnok County